Elections to Oldham Council were held on 1 May 2008. One third of the council was up for election. The council remained in no overall control with the Liberal Democrats overtaking the Labour Party as the largest party.

After the election, the composition of the council was:
Liberal Democrat 30
Labour 22
Conservative 7
Independent 1

Election result

Ward results

Alexandra ward

Chadderton Central ward

Chadderton North ward

Chadderton South ward

Coldhurst ward

Crompton ward

Failsworth East ward

Failsworth West ward

Hollinwood ward

Medlock Vale ward

Royton North ward

Royton South ward

Saddleworth North ward

Saddleworth South ward

Saddleworth West and Lees ward

St James ward

St Marys ward

Shaw ward

Waterhead ward

Werneth ward

References
Oldham Council election, 2008 - nominations
Oldham councillors

2008 English local elections
2008
2000s in Greater Manchester